Richard Jones  (born 1875) was a Welsh international footballer. He was part of the Wales national football team, playing 1 match on 19 March 1898 against Scotland. At club level, he played for Leicester Fosse.

See also
 List of Wales international footballers (alphabetical)

References

1875 births
Place of birth missing

Date of death missing

Year of death missing
Welsh footballers

Wales international footballers
Leicester City F.C. players
Association footballers not categorized by position